Terraconia is a genus of very small freshwater snails with an operculum, aquatic gastropod mollusks in the family Hydrobiidae.

Species
Species within the genus Terraconia include:
Terraconia rolani Ramos, Arconada, Rolan & Moreno, 2000

References

Gastropod genera
Hydrobiidae